Evil Man may refer to:
 Evil Man, a different recording of Evil Woman by the band Crow
 Evil Man, a song by King Gizzard & the Lizard Wizard, see Eyes Like the Sky